Caraman may refer to:


Places
 Caraman, Haute-Garonne, a commune in the Haute-Garonne department, France
 Saint-Félix-de-Caraman, the old name of Saint-Félix-Lauragais, a commune in the Haute-Garonne department, France

People
 Alexandru Caraman (fl. 1990–2016), former Transnistrian politician
 Ludmila Caraman (born 1985), Moldovan footballer

Caraman-Chimay family of Belgium
 François-Joseph-Philippe de Riquet (1771–1843), Count of Charaman
 Joseph de Riquet de Caraman (1808–1886), Belgian diplomat and industrialist
 Joseph de Riquet de Caraman-Chimay (1836–1892), Belgian diplomat and politician
 Joseph, Prince de Caraman-Chimay (1858–1937), Belgian aristocrat and Olympic fencer
 Élisabeth, Countess Greffulhe (1860–1952), born Riquet de Caraman-Chimay
 Clara Ward, Princesse de Caraman-Chimay (1873–1916), wealthy American socialite and wife of Joseph (1858–1937)

See also
 Karaman, a city in south central Turkey
 Karamanids, an Anatolian beylik of the 14th and 15th centuries
 Qaraman, a village in Azerbaijan